Penwortham is a civil parish in the South Ribble district of Lancashire, England.  It contains 12 buildings that are recorded in the National Heritage List for England as designated listed buildings.  Of these, one is listed at Grade II*, the middle grade, and the others are at Grade II, the lowest grade.  The parish contains the town of Penwortham and surrounding countryside.  The listed buildings include a medieval wayside cross, a church and structures in the churchyard, houses of varying dates, an inn, and a railway viaduct carrying the West Coast Main Line over the River Ribble.


Key

Buildings

References

Citations

Sources

Lists of listed buildings in Lancashire
Buildings and structures in South Ribble